is a hot spring resort in the city of  Kaga, Ishikawa Prefecture, Japan. It is one of the largest in the three prefectures which constitute the Hokuriku region of Japan.

The onsen has one hotel and 31 ryokan.

History
Yamashiro Onsen has a very ancient history, and there are several myths about its foundation.

One story attributes it to the wandering Buddhist monk Gyōki in the Nara period who discovered the springs while following an injured crow and seeing it bathe in the hot waters.

During the Heian period it developed as part of a Buddhist temple called , dedicated to Yakushi Nyorai, the Buddha of medicine. It was patronised in the Sengoku period by Akechi Mitsuhide and was visited in the Meiji period by numerous literary personages.

After World War II, it developed due it its ease of access to Osaka and Kyoto.

Gallery

References

External links

  
JNTO site

Hot springs of Ishikawa Prefecture
Tourist attractions in Ishikawa Prefecture
Spa towns in Japan
Kaga, Ishikawa